Hussain Abbas (Arabic:حسين عباس) (born 30 November 1994) is an Emirati footballer. He currently plays for Baniyas as a left back.

External links

References

Emirati footballers
1994 births
Living people
Al-Nasr SC (Dubai) players
Al Wahda FC players
Baniyas Club players
UAE Pro League players
Association football fullbacks